Admiral Jones may refer to:

United Kingdom
Lewis Jones (Royal Navy officer) (1797–1895), British Royal Navy admiral
Philip Jones (Royal Navy officer) (born 1960), British Royal Navy admiral
Theophilus Jones (Royal Navy officer) (1760–1835), Irish-born Royal Navy admiral
Theobald Jones (1790–1868), Irish-born Royal Navy admiral, Member of Parliament and lichenologist, nephew of Theophilus Jones
William Gore Jones (1826–1888), British Royal Navy admiral

United States
Carl Henry Jones (1893–1958), U.S. Navy admiral
Claud Ashton Jones (1885–1948), U.S. Navy rear admiral
Don A. Jones (1912–2000), NOAA Commissioned Officer Corps rear admiral
Donald S. Jones (1928–2004), U.S. Navy admiral
Hilary P. Jones (1863–1938), U.S. Navy admiral

Other
George Jones (Canadian admiral) (1895–1946), Royal Canadian Navy vice admiral
John Paul Jones (1747–1792), Scottish-American naval captain, later an Imperial Russian Navy rear admiral
Peter Jones (admiral) (born 1957), Royal Australian Navy vice admiral
Trevor Jones (admiral) (fl. 1970s–2010s), Royal Australian Navy rear admiral

See also
Everard Hardman-Jones (1881–1962), British Royal Navy vice admiral
Roger Moylan-Jones (born 18 April 1940), British Royal Navy rear admiral